Secret Passage is a 2004 film directed by Ademir Kenović. It was written by Kenović and Olivier Bonas.  The film stars John Turturro, Katherine Borowitz, Tara Fitzgerald, and Hannah Taylor-Gordon. In the United Kingdom, the film is mostly known as The Lion's Mouth.

Plot

The film starts in 1492, in Spain. Jews are being chased everywhere. They have two choices: either to convert or to face trial and execution. Isabel (Katherine Borowitz), and Clara (Tara Fitzgerald) are growing up with terror. Although forcibly baptized, the sisters are chased through Christendom until they arrive in Venice. In Venice, Isabel organizes a secret passage in order to give refuge to the refugees who were fleeing away in the fear of the Inquisition. Isabel decides that, in order to be safe, her family must flee to Istanbul, the only place where Jews are not hated. But Clara refuses to leave, because she is in love with a Venetian named Paolo Zane (John Turturro). When Isabel somewhat tries to force Clara to move to Istanbul, Clara gets furious at the former and is almost ready to break all family ties with Isabel. In these battles of misunderstandings, Clara's young daughter Victoria (Hannah Taylor-Gordon) is trapped, who finds that she is about to be married into the same faith that murdered her own father.

Cast

John Turturro as Paolo Zane
Tara Fitzgerald as Clara
Katherine Borowitz as Isabel
Anton Rodgers as Foscari
Hannah Taylor-Gordon as Victoria
Ronald Pickup as Da Monte
Richard Harrington as Joseph
Seymour Matthews as Ruben
Marc Pickering as Andrea Zane
Carmen Sorrenti as Francesca
Adam Kotz as Inquisitor
Alassandra Costanzo as Donna Benveniste

References

External links

2004 films
Films set in the 1490s
Films set in Spain
Films set in Venice
Films about Jews and Judaism
Films scored by Stephen Warbeck
2004 drama films
2000s English-language films